Derrick Peynado (born 30 January 1960) is a Jamaican sprinter. He competed in the men's 400 metres at the 1980 Summer Olympics.

References

1960 births
Living people
Athletes (track and field) at the 1980 Summer Olympics
Jamaican male sprinters
Olympic athletes of Jamaica
Place of birth missing (living people)